The Billboard Hot 100 is a chart that ranks the best-performing singles of the United States. Published by Billboard magazine, the data are compiled by Nielsen SoundScan based collectively on each single's weekly physical sales and airplay. In 2002, there were seven singles that topped the chart, the lowest number of singles to top the chart in a single year ever (if the two songs which peaked in 2001 are included, 2002 would have the second lowest number of chart-topping singles in a year, behind 2005). Although nine singles reached number one in fifty-two issues of the magazine in the calendar year, two songs began their peak position in 2001 and are thus excluded.

In 2002, five acts earned their first U.S. number one single, either as a lead artist or featured guest. These artists were Ashanti, Nelly, Kelly Clarkson, and Eminem. Kelly Rowland, despite having hit number one with Destiny's Child, also earns her first number one song as a solo act. In 2002, Ja Rule, Ashanti, and Nelly had two number-one singles in the Billboard Hot 100.

Most of the number-one singles in 2002 were extended chart-toppers. "Lose Yourself" is the longest-running single, topping the Billboard Hot 100 for 12 consecutive weeks, eight of which were in this calendar year. "Foolish" and "Dilemma" both stayed at number one for 10 weeks, the latter of which was non-consecutive. "Ain't It Funny" by Jennifer Lopez, in its remix version with Ja Rule, peaked at number one for six weeks.

Rock band Nickelback's "How You Remind Me", which first peaked at number one in 2001, is the best-performing single of 2002. "Lose Yourself", which is the soundtrack to the 2002 film 8 Mile, is the second most-successful soundtrack song in the entire rock era. It is behind Whitney Houston's version of "I Will Always Love You", having topped the chart for 14 weeks. "Lose Yourself" is also the longest-running Oscar-winning number-one song since singer-actor Bing Crosby's "White Christmas" had 14 weeks on top in the 1940s. "A Moment Like This" is noted for its fifty-two-to-one leap in 2002, breaking the 38-year-old record set by The Beatles' "Can't Buy Me Love", which jumped from number twenty-seven to one.

Nelly became the first act to have consecutive number-one singles as the lead artist since 1994, when Boyz II Men had consecutive number-ones.

Chart history

Number-one artists

See also
2002 in music
List of Billboard number-one singles
Billboard Year-End Hot 100 singles of 2002

References

Additional sources
Fred Bronson's Billboard Book of Number 1 Hits, 5th Edition
Joel Whitburn's Top Pop Singles 1955-2008, 12 Edition
Joel Whitburn Presents the Billboard Hot 100 Charts: The 2000s
Additional information obtained can be verified within Billboard's online archive services and print editions of the magazine.

2002 record charts
2002